The 1910 Ohio gubernatorial election was held on November 8, 1910. Incumbent Democrat Judson Harmon defeated Republican nominee Warren G. Harding with 51.61% of the vote.

General election

Candidates
Major party candidates
Judson Harmon, Democratic
Warren G. Harding, Republican 

Other candidates
Tom Clifford, Socialist
Henry A. Thompson, Prohibition
J.R. Malley, Socialist Labor

Results

References

1910
Ohio
Gubernatorial